Martin Schneider (5 March 1938 – 22 January 2021) was a German opera director and former .

Life 
Born in Merseburg, Schneider studied music education, Germanistik and musicology as well as violin, piano and singing at the Martin-Luther-Universität Halle-Wittenberg. His teachers included the musicologist Walther Siegmund-Schultze and the music historian Max Schneider. Schneider completed his studies with a diploma and worked as an editorial assistant at the Rundfunk der DDR. From 1974 onwards, Martin Schneider was "1st Spielleiter" of the Opernhaus Halle, of which he became director in 1978. Since 1970, guest productions have taken him to other houses such as the Hans Otto Theater in Potsdam, the  Amsterdam and the Staatstheater Cottbus as well as to Deutscher Fernsehfunk.

Since 1980, Schneider has been active as a freelancer, director and university lecturer, including teaching assignments at the University of Music and Theatre Leipzig and at the Berlin University of the Arts. From 1992 to 2003, he was professor and "scenic director" of the Music Theatre. From 2003 until 2006, Martin Schneider was lecturer at the Hochschule für Musik "Hanns Eisler" Berlin.

Schneider is Christoph Schneider's father, the drummer of the rock band Rammstein, and by Constanze Schneider, a designer and costume designer. Together with his wife Antje Schneider, he undertook reading tours with literary-musical programmes.

Schneider died at the age of 82.

Further reading 
 Axel Schniederjürgen (ed.): Kürschners Musiker-Handbuch. 5th edition, K. G. Saur Verlag, Munich 2006, .

References

External links 

Academic staff of the Hochschule für Musik Hanns Eisler Berlin
German music educators
German opera directors
1938 births
2021 deaths
People from Merseburg